Hurricane is the lead single by the singer-songwriter Natalie Grant from her album of the same name which was released on October 15, 2013.

Composition
Hurricane is originally in the key of G Major, with a tempo of 105 beats per minute. Grant's vocal range spans from G3 to D5 during the song.

Music video 
A lyric video for the single Hurricane premiered April 29, 2013, on YouTube.

Awards

GMA Dove Awards

Charts

Weekly Charts

Year-end charts

References 

2013 singles
Gospel songs
American pop songs
Contemporary Christian songs
2013 songs
Songs written by Matt Bronleewe
Curb Records singles
Songs written by Cindy Morgan (singer)